James Edward Johnson III (born June 6, 2000), known professionally as BabyTron, is an American rapper and songwriter. Known for his punchlines and beat selection, he initially gained popularity in 2019 with his track "Jesus Shuttleworth".

Early life and education
James Johnson was born on June 6, 2000, in Ypsilanti, Michigan. He attended Lincoln High School in Ypsilanti.

Career

2017–2021: Early career, Bin Reaper and Bin Reaper 2 
BabyTron began taking music seriously at age 17, alongside childhood friends TrDee and StanWill, and they established the rap trio ShittyBoyz while in high school. BabyTron would also consistently release solo songs and mixtapes on streaming platforms. His 2019 solo track "Jesus Shuttlesworth" became viral within the hip hop community, with a variety of memes spawning from the track. The song was featured on his 2019 mixtape Bin Reaper. In 2021, he would feature on the Lil Yachty project, Michigan Boy Boat. BabyTron released the Bin Reaper 2 mixtape in October 2021 with features from Lil Yachty, Miles Bridges (credited as RTB MB), and ShittyBoyz.

2022–present: Megatron and Bin Reaper 3
BabyTron gained traction in 2022 through his series of tracks that feature him rapping on a multitude of popular beats in one song. This began with "Prince of the Mitten" in January and was followed up with "King of the Galaxy" later that month.

BabyTron released the album Megatron on March 4, 2022, through Empire and The Hip Hop Lab. His song "Emperor of the Universe" was released on May 17, and featured a music video directed by Cole Bennett.

He was named as part of the XXL 2022 freshman Class on June 14, 2022.

On August 2, his single "Blah Blah Blah" with TrDee was released. ShittyBoyz' second mixtape, Trifecta 2, was released on August 5, 2022.

On September 19, BabyTron announced his next album Bin Reaper 3 . On October 28, 2022, Bin Reaper 3: Old Testament released, peaking at number 69 on the Billboard 200, his first entry on the chart.

On January 5, 2023, BabyTron announced his third album,  Bin Reaper 3: New Testament. The album includes features from Lil Yachty, Babyface Ray and Cordae. New Testament acts as a sequel to Bin Reaper 3: Old Testament. The album was released on January 13, 2023 and peaked at number 100 on the Billboard 200.

Following his arrest on February 8, 2023, BabyTron surprise released the EP Out On Bond on February 24.

Legal issues
On February 8th, 2023, Johnson was pulled over and arrested after a police officer conducted a probable cause search of his vehicle finding: marijuana, marijuana edibles, psilocybin mushroom edibles, and a 9mm handgun. He was booked into Dawson County Jail in Lexington, Nebraska, for Possession of a Controlled Substance. He was released after posting 10% of a $15,000 bond.

Discography

Studio albums

Mixtapes

Extended plays

References 

Songwriters from Michigan
Living people
American male rappers
2000 births
Rappers from Detroit